Turlock Cal Express is an American professional indoor soccer team based in Turlock, California. They joined the Major Arena Soccer League (then Professional Arena Soccer League) in 2011 and are currently members of the Major Arena Soccer League 2. The team is owned and coached by Arturo "Art" Pulido.

Year-by-year

Personnel
.

Active players

Staff
Head coach: Arturo Pulido
Assistant coach: Edgar Martinez
General Manager: Matt Warner
Director of Operations: Cristy Pulido
Owners: Arturo Pulido and Matt Warner

References

External links
Turlock Cal Express official website

 
2011 establishments in California
Association football clubs established in 2011
Indoor soccer clubs in the United States
Major Arena Soccer League teams
Professional Arena Soccer League teams
Sports in Modesto, California